Hassan Al-Ali (born 10 February 2002) is a Saudi Arabian footballer who plays as a striker for Saudi First Division League side Al-Ahli.

Career
Al-Ali started his career at the youth teams of hometown club Al-Qarah. On 18 October 2017, Al-Ali joined Al-Ahli. On 7 August 2020, he signed his first professional contract with Al-Ahli. He was first called up to the first team in January 2021 following injuries to Omar Al Somah and Muhannad Assiri. He made his first-team debut on 31 January 2021 in the 2–2 draw against Al-Batin.

Career statistics

Club

References

External links
 
 

Living people
2002 births
People from Al-Hasa
Association football forwards
Saudi Arabian footballers
Saudi Arabia youth international footballers
Al-Qarah FC players
Al-Ahli Saudi FC players
Saudi Professional League players
Saudi First Division League players